The 1975 U.S. Pro Tennis Championships was a men's tennis tournament played on outdoor green clay courts (Har-Tru) at the Longwood Cricket Club in Chestnut Hill, Massachusetts in the United States. It was classified as a Group AA category tournament and was part of the 1975 Grand Prix circuit. It was the 48th edition of the tournament and was held from August 19 through August 25, 1975. Second-seeded and defending champion Björn Borg won the singles title and the accompanying $16,000 first prize money. The tournament started a day late due to rain.

Finals

Singles
 Björn Borg defeated  Guillermo Vilas 6–3, 6–4, 6–2
 It was Borg's 4th singles title of the year and the 12th of his career.

Doubles
 Brian Gottfried /  Raúl Ramírez defeated  John Andrews /  Mike Estep 4–6, 6–3, 7–6

References

External links
 ITF tournament edition details
 Longwood Cricket Club – list of U.S. Pro Champions

U.S. Pro Tennis Championships
U.S. Pro Championships
U.S. Pro Championships
U.S. Pro Tennis Championships
U.S. Pro Tennis Championships
Chestnut Hill, Massachusetts
Clay court tennis tournaments
History of Middlesex County, Massachusetts
Sports in Middlesex County, Massachusetts
Tennis tournaments in Massachusetts
Tourist attractions in Middlesex County, Massachusetts